Atusaye Nyondo (born 15 November 1990) is a Malawian footballer who currently plays for Saint George in Ethiopia.

Club career 
Nyondo began his career with Silver Strikers and signed for South African National First Division side Carara Kicks on 6 August 2009. He spent two seasons playing for Kicks and finished the 2010–11 season as the division's top scorer with 15 goals.

Nyondo moved on loan to Pretoria University from Supersport United for the 2013-14 season, making into a permanent switch at the end of his loan spell.

Nyondo joined Tshakhuma Tsha Madzivhandila F.C. in February 2019, signing a one and a half year deal. In March 2019 it was reported, that Nyondo only had received 10.000 South African rand a month from the club, which was less than half of what he agreed to when he put pen to paper. Nyondo said, that it was only him and his fellow Malawian teammate, Joseph Kamwendo, who didn't got paid and that the club hadn't explained properly, they just said that it was the budget, so Nyondo was forced to borrow money from his friends and family. Nyondo got his contract terminated a few weeks later. 

In November 2019, Nyondo signed with Ethiopian club Saint George SC.

International career 
Nyondo represented the Malawi national football team at 2010 African Cup of Nations.

References 

1990 births
Living people
Malawian footballers
Malawi international footballers
2010 Africa Cup of Nations players
Malawian expatriate footballers
SuperSport United F.C. players
University of Pretoria F.C. players
Bloemfontein Celtic F.C. players
Silver Strikers FC players
Saint George S.C. players
Pretoria Callies F.C. players
South African Premier Division players
Association football forwards
Expatriate soccer players in South Africa
Expatriate footballers in Ethiopia
Malawian expatriate sportspeople in South Africa
Malawian expatriate sportspeople in Ethiopia
Carara Kicks F.C. players